Various superhero groups by the name Teen Titans (or similar variants) have been published in comic books by DC Comics since 1964.

Comics publication history

Teen Titans (1964–1978)

The first incarnation of the group unofficially debuted in The Brave and the Bold #54 (July 1964), before appearing as "The Teen Titans" in #60, and again in Showcase #59 (December 1965). These appearances led to a comic of the same name (debuting with a cover date of February 1966) which ran until 1972/1973, when it was cancelled with issue #43. Briefly revived in 1976 for a further 10 issues, the series was again cancelled after #53 told the team's origin for the first time.

Key team
The original Teen Titans team consisted of the sidekicks to DC's Batman, Flash, and Aquaman — the first Robin, Kid Flash, and Aqualad. They were joined in their second appearance by Wonder Girl, erroneously presented as the sidekick of Wonder Woman.

New Teen Titans (1980–1988)
(Becomes Tales of the Teen Titans with #41)

The series was relaunched with the prefix "New" in an issue cover-dated November 1980. Written by Marv Wolfman with art by George Pérez, both of whom had recently moved to DC from Marvel, this incarnation (and these creators) would prove to be arguably the best-known and most-popular comics incarnation of the Titans teams. The book took on "modern sensibilities," and addressed a number of hard-hitting issues, including a memorable couple of special anti-drugs issues.

Previewed in DC Comics Presents #26, the New Teen Titans series ran for 40 issues (until March 1984), before changing title to Tales of the Teen Titans between issues #41 and #91. To capitalise on the series' success, DC launched a separate New Teen Titans title concurrent to the renamed Tales... title on better-quality paper. After several months featuring twice as many new Titans stories, Tales of the Teen Titans #59 turned that title into a reprint comic, with #60–91 reprinting the second series at a delay of about 15 months from issue #1–32 under new covers. The reprint title eventually floundered and was cancelled in July 1988.

Key team
No longer restricted solely to sidekicks to existing heroes, the Titans team branched out and included key heroes such as the college-aged Cyborg, Starfire, Beast Boy, and Raven.

New Teen Titans vol. 2 (1984–1996)
(Becomes The New Titans with #50)

The second New Teen Titans series ran for 49 issues between August 1984 and November 1988, whereupon it was also retitled, becoming simply The New Titans with issue #50, under which title it continued for another 80 issues until February 1996. Initially featuring the same Wolfman/Pérez creative team as the first series, the artist left after issue #5 to return to art duties (and as co-writer) for 11 issues starting with the change of title and the five-issue "Who is Wonder Girl?" arc in The New Titans #50–54 (December 1988 – March 1989).

Teen Titans Spotlight On (1986–1988)

With DC's Teen Titans comics rivaling Marvel's X-Men for popularity, another new title was launched, this time with the explicit purpose of highlighting individual Titans, rather than focusing on the team as a whole. With the stated remit (from the first comic) that, "Teen Titans Spotlight On: is a new concept in comics ... a book where we can put the spotlight on individual members of the Teen Titans, one at a time, and let each story dictate how many issues it should run." The series ran for 21 issues, departing slightly from its aim to highlight individuals, and culminating in a "Spotlight" on the 1960s Teen Titans team as a whole.

Team Titans (1992–1994)

As part of the "Titans Hunt" storyline in New Teen Titans vol. 2, a further Titans-related title was launched with a five-comic issue #1(a-e) in September 1992, featuring the time-displaced "Team Titans". This comic series ran concurrently to the New Teen Titans vol. 2 series, as the Team Titans crossed over both with that series and with Deathstroke. Teen Titans resources website TitansTower.com quotes writer/artist Phil Jimenez as saying that this series was effectively DC's answer to X-Force, but wound up (under Jimenez) going in directions contrary to DC's vision and the Zero Hour crossover event, which led to the series' cancellation with issue #24 (September 1994), after the team's timeline was eradicated during the event.

Teen Titans vol. 2 (1996–1998)

Thirty years after the original Teen Titans series debut, and just nine months after the demise of The New Titans (New Teen Titans vol. 2), a new Titans series was launched (in October 1996) as the second Teen Titans-named series. The series was spearheaded by writer/penciller Dan Jurgens, who wrote and drew all twenty-four issues (with inks for the first 15 issues by Titans-favourite George Pérez). Although the name was the same, the team was radically different, but with ties to the previous incarnations — as well as a four-issue storyline reuniting the original team. The series ran for two years, until September 1998.

Young Justice (1998–2003)
September 1998 also saw the launch of writer Peter David's Teen Titans-esque title Young Justice, featuring the main DCU teenaged heroes the third Robin, the time-displaced Flash-descendant Impulse, and the cloned Superboy (with the later additions of Arrowette and the second Wonder Girl, among others).

The Titans (1999–2003)

By popular demand, the original Teen Titans team (now all older, and under new aliases) was given its own title once more in March 1999, after a three-issue (December 1998 – February 1999) mini-series teaming them with the JLA in JLA/Titans: The Technis Imperative, which "featured absolutely everyone that was ever a Titan, as they joined together to save Cyborg from alien influence." Following that mini-series (written by Devin Grayson and Phil Jimenez, with art by Jimenez), the new The Titans series debuted in March 1999, written by Grayson, with art initially by Mark Buckingham and Wade Von Grawbadger. Grayson left after 20 issues, and the series continued until issue #50 (April 2003), and the team reappeared in Judd Winick's July–August 2003 3-issue mini-series Titans/Young Justice: Graduation Day. This crossover, with the then-current (and Titans-like) Young Justice team, marked the dissolution of both the Young Justice and Titans teams, as well as the alleged death of Troia and the seemingly lasting death of Omen.

Outsiders vol. 3 (2003–2007)
The Graduation Day crossover marked the end of The Titans and Young Justice, but served as a launch point for two new series and teams, one of which was Winick's own Outsiders, which debuted in August 2003, and featured some former Titans (notably original Teen Titans Arsenal and Nightwing) in an "edgy, more grown up" series, which ran for 50 issues, until November 2007.

Teen Titans vol. 3 (2003–2011)

In addition to the more "adult"-oriented Outsiders series, the end of The Titans and the events of Titans/Young Justice: Graduation Day saw the debut of a third Teen Titans series, launched in September 2003 by writer Geoff Johns (who would write the first 45 issues, as well as sundry spin-offs), with artist Mike McKone for most of the first 23 issues. The series featured (and features) Titans old and new, including the core Young Justice team, whose Robin, Impulse, and Wonder Girl fill the shoes of original Titans' first Robin, Kid Flash, and Wonder Girl. The team was founded by other former-Titans Cyborg, Starfire, and Beast Boy, and continues to tie into most previous incarnations of the team in a number of ways.

Titans vol. 2 (2008–2011)

In June 2008, a new Titans title was launched to run alongside Teen Titans vol. 3, initially featuring a storyline based around an attack on all former Titans. The cover to issue #1 confirmed the inclusion of original Titans Nightwing, Starfire, Donna Troy, Flash, Cyborg, Beast Boy, and Raven. The series is written by Judd Winick, and features art by Joe Benitez and Victor Llamas. The first issue has art by Ian Churchill, but due to an injury he was unable to pencil the next three issues.

Other comics
The various Teen Titans comics series have crossed over with titles including Action Comics Weekly, Crisis on Infinite Earths (written and illustrated by the New Teen Titans creative team), Deathstroke (spun off into his own comic, but initially created as a Titans villain), Hawk and Dove, Infinity Inc., Omega Men, Outsiders, Young Justice, and Zero Hour. In addition, various Titans have starred in their own comics, which occasionally had a bearing on Titans-related matters — these include (in particular) original Teen Titans Donna Troy and Dick Grayson in Darkstars and Nightwing, respectively, and more recent Titans Tim Drake, Bart Allen, and Kon El in Robin, Impulse, and Superboy, among many others.

Sundry one-shots, crossovers, and specials have also been published through the years. These include Annuals, Secret Files issues, and include notable issues such as:

Marvel and DC Present: The Uncanny X-Men and the New Teen Titans #1 (1982)
The New Teen Titans (Drug Awareness Specials) #1–3 (1983)
Titans $ell-out! Special #1 (1992)
Tempest #1–4 (1996–1997)
Titans: Scissors, Paper, Stone (1997) (a manga-style Elseworlds title)
Arsenal #1–4 (1998)
Girlfrenzy: Donna Troy (1998)
JLA/Titans: The Technis Imperative #1–3 (1998–1999)
Beast Boy #1–4 (2000)
Titans/Legion of Super-Heroes: Universe Ablaze #1–4 (2000)
Titans/Young Justice: Graduation Day #1–3 (2003)
Teen Titans/Legion Special #1 (2004)
DC Special: The Return of Donna Troy #1–4 (2005)
DC Special: Raven #1–5 (2008)
DC Special: Cyborg #1–6 (2008)

Teen Titans Go! (2004–2008)

In 2004, shortly after the debut of the Teen Titans TV series (itself loosely based on Wolfman and Pérez' New Teen Titans comics), DC launched a companion comic under their Johnny DC children's imprint. Teen Titans Go! broadly kept to the anime-inspired look and style of the TV series and sometimes featured "chibi versions of the Titans populating the panel borders with commentary or the occasional knock-knock joke." The comic was set in the continuity of the cartoon, fleshing out its world and introducing new characters.

Although the TV series was unable to use the character of Wonder Girl "[d]ue to licensing restrictions," she became a recurring character in the tie-in comic in Teen Titans Go! #36, using a design by producer Glen Murakami, who also provided the cover art to that issue. The series was written by J. Torres, with art primarily by Todd Nauck and Larry Stucker. It outlasted the TV show, running 55 issues through July 2008.

Main team
The comic features the same team as the TV series on which it's based (Robin, Starfire, Cyborg, Beast Boy, and Raven), with guest appearances by other heroes such as Wonder Girl and Speedy.

Tiny Titans (2008–2012)
In February 2008, a second Johnny DC children's Titans title was launched, this time clearly dropping the "Teen" moniker, in favor of highlighting the youth of the characters featured. Written and illustrated by Art Baltazar and Franco, the series features "your favorite Titans, in their cutest possible form," with each issue featuring a number of "cute" stories. Unlike Teen Titans Go!, which has an overtly Japanese anime style, Tiny Titans is more reminiscent of American children's cartoons, albeit sometimes described as utilising the chibi form, by virtue of its "tiny" subjects.

Publications

Primary ongoing series
Teen Titans #1–53 (February 1966 – February 1973; November 1976 – February 1978)
The New Teen Titans #1–40 (November 1980 – March 1984)
The New Teen Titans Annual #1–2 (1982–1983)
Tales of the Teen Titans #41–58 (April 1984 – October 1985)
Tales of the Teen Titans Annual #3–4 (1984–1986)
The New Teen Titans vol. 2, #1–49 (August 1984 – November 1988)
The New Teen Titans Annual vol. 2, #1–4 (1985–1988)
The New Titans #50–130 (December 1988 – December 1995)
The New Titans Annual #5–11 (1989–1995)
Teen Titans vol. 2, #1–24 (August 1996 – July 1998)
Teen Titans Annual vol. 2, #1 (1997)
The Titans #1–50 (January 1999 – February 2003)
The Titans Annual #1 (2000)
Teen Titans vol. 3, #1–100 (July 2003 – August 2011)
Teen Titans Annual vol. 3, #1–2 (2006–2009)
Titans vol. 2, #1–38 (Abril 2008 – August 2011)
Titans Annual vol. 2, #1 (2011)
Teen Titans vol. 4, #1–30 (September 2011 – April 2014)
Teen Titans Annual vol. 4, #1–3 (2012–2014)
Teen Titans vol. 5, #1–24 (July 2014– September 2016)
Teen Titans Annual vol. 5 #1–2 (2015–2016)
Titans vol. 3, #1-36 (September 2016 - June 2019)
Teen Titans vol. 6, #1-47 (December 2016 - January 2021)

Spin-off series
Teen Titans Spotlight On #1–21 (August 1986 – April 1988)
Team Titans #1–24 (September 1992 – September 1994)
Team Titans Annual #1–2 (1993–1994)
Teen Titans Go! #1–55  (January 2004 – July 2008)
Tiny Titans #1–50 (April 2008 – May 2012)

Limited series and specials
Specials and limited series which are part of an ongoing story in the primary series, or became ongoing series, are also included above.

Limited series
 Blackest Nights - Titans #1-3 (2009)
 Convergence - The New Teen Titans (2015)
 Convergence - The Titans (2015)
 Smallville - Titans #1-4
The New Teen Titans Drug Awareness Giveaway #1–3 (1983)
Tales of the New Teen Titans #1–4 (September – December 1982) Written by Marv Wolfman with art by George Pérez.
JLA/Titans: The Technis Imperative #1–3 (December 1998 – February 1999)
Titans/Legion of Super-Heroes: Universe Ablaze #1–4 (March – June 2000)
Titans Secret Files and Origins #1–2 (March 1999 – August 2000)
Titans/Young Justice: Graduation Day #1–3 (July – August 2003)
Teen Titans: Year One #1–6 (January – June 2008)
 Terror Titans (2008)
Titans: Hunt #1–8 (October 2015 – May 2016)
Teen Titans: Earth One #1-2 (2014, 2016)

One-shots and original graphic novels
Marvel and DC Present: The Uncanny X-Men and the New Teen Titans #1 (DC Comics/Marvel Comics; January 1982)
Titans $ell-out! Special #1 (November 1992)
Titans: Scissors, Paper, Stone (January 1997)
New Year's Evil: Dark Nemesis (February 1998)
 Teen Titans - Cold Case (2016)
Teen Titans/Outsiders Secret Files and Origins 2003 (June 2003)
Teen Titans/Legion Special (September 2004)
Teen Titans/Outsiders Secret Files and Origins 2005 (August 2005)
Teen Titans East Special (November 2007)
Teen Titans: The Lost Annual (2008)
 Titan Beat (1996)
Titans: Rebirth (June 2016)
 Titans - Villains For Hire (2010)
Teen Titans: Rebirth (September 2016)
 Teen Titans - Silver Age (2000)
 Titans Special (2018)
 Teen Titans Special (2018)
 Teen Titans Future's End (2014)
 Teen Titans Special - The Lazarus Contract (2017)

Reprint series

Tales of the Teen Titans #59–91 (November 1985 – July 1988)

Collected editions

Silver Age Teen Titans

New Teen Titans

The New Titans

The Titans

Teen Titans (2003–2011)
Note: Issues #27–28, penciled by artist Rob Liefeld and written by Gail Simone, are not collected in any of the trade paperbacks and were reprinted in DC Comics Presents: Brightest Day #3 (Feb. 2011), which also included Legends of the DC Universe #26–27 (tying in with characters spotlighted in Brightest Day). Issues #48–49, which tie in with the "Amazons Attack" Wonder Woman story, are likewise not collected in a trade paperback.

Titans (2008–2011)

The New 52 Teen Titans  (2011–2014)

The New 52 Teen Titans re-launch (2014–2016)

DC Rebirth Titans, Teen Titans (2016–present)

Notes

References

 Comics
Lists of comic book titles

vi:Teen Titans